The year 2005 Carnegie World Club Challenge was contested by Super League IX champions Leeds Rhinos and 2004 NRL season premiers, the Bulldogs. The match was played on 4 February at Elland Road, Leeds before 37,208 spectators. Australian Sean Hampstead was the referee. The home team came out winners in the end of what was, at the time, the highest-scoring WCC match ever, with a final scoreline of 39-32.

Qualification

Leeds Rhinos

The 2004 Super League Grand Final was held on Saturday 16 October 2004, at Old Trafford, Manchester, UK. The game was played between Leeds Rhinos, who finished top of the league after the 28 weekly rounds, and Bradford Bulls, who finished second after the weekly rounds.

Bulldogs

The 2004 NRL Grand Final was the conclusive and premiership-deciding game of the 2004 NRL season. It was contested by the Bulldogs, who had finished the regular season in 2nd place, and the Sydney Roosters, who had finished the regular season in 1st place. After both sides eliminated the rest of 2004's top eight teams over the finals series, they faced each other in a grand final for the first time since the 1980 NSWRFL season's decider.

Match details

The Bulldogs had less than a week to adjust from Sydney summer to Yorkshire winter with four training sessions to prepare whereas the Rhinos had been playing friendlies since Boxing Day. The Sydnesiders were also without six senior players who stayed at home after off-season surgeries.

Leeds opened the scoring with their left centre Chev Walker crossing around the five-minute mark. Kevin Sinfield's conversion was successful so the Rhinos were leading 6 - 0.

References

Sources

2005 World Club Challenge at superleague.co.uk
Rhinos power to world club crown - bbc.co.uk
Carnegie & Rhinos on top of the world - lmu.ac.uk
2005 World Club Challenge at rlphotos.com
2005 World Club Challenge at rugbyleagueproject.com

World Club Challenge
Canterbury-Bankstown Bulldogs matches
Leeds Rhinos matches
World Club Challenge
World Club Challenge
World Club Challenge
Sports competitions in Leeds
Rugby league in West Yorkshire